Mitch Krebs was the co-anchor of the 6:00pm and 10:00pm news at KSFY-TV in Sioux Falls, South Dakota until February 1, 2007. He is married to former South Dakota Secretary of State Shantel Krebs (R).

Biography
Mitch Krebs was born in Fort Dodge, Iowa. He grew up in Austin, Minnesota and attended the University of Minnesota. In 1996, Krebs joined the news team at KSFY-TV. In 1999, he and Nancy Naeve became co-anchors of the 6:00pm and 10:00pm newscasts at KSFY-TV.

From February 2007 to November 2008 Krebs served as press secretary for South Dakota Governor Mike Rounds.

In December 2008 – 2010 Krebs was Assistant Vice President of Media and Community Relations at Avera McKennan Hospital.  In 2010 he left Avera to become Public Policy Director at POET, the world's largest biofuels producer.  From August 2013-November 2014 Krebs was Communications Director for Rounds for Senate.

Krebs currently serves as principle for Herd Wisdom LLC, a company that focuses on communications, messaging and strategy with clients in agriculture, energy and broadcasting.

He lives in rural Stanley County, SD with his wife, Shantel Krebs.

External links
Mitch Krebs's biography

References

Year of birth missing (living people)
Living people
People from Fort Dodge, Iowa
People from Austin, Minnesota
People from Sioux Falls, South Dakota
South Dakota television reporters
South Dakota television anchors
Journalists from South Dakota